In Irish mythology, Caitlín was the wife of Balor of the Fomorians and, by him, the mother of Ethniu. She was also a prophetess and warned Balor of his impending defeat by the Tuatha Dé Danann in the second battle of Magh Tuiredh. During that battle she wounded the Dagda with a projectile weapon. She was also known by the nickname Cethlenn of the Crooked Teeth.

Name 
Ceithlinn in modern Irish is pronounced like "Kehlen", and her name is sometimes indicated by that spelling. Kethlenda is the form of the name that appeared in Roderick O'Flaherty's Ogygia or Rerum Hibernicarum Chronologia, written in Latin, reused as "Kethlenda of the Crooked Teeth" by story-reteller P. W. Joyce.

Nickname
Ceithlinn is called by the nickname Ceithlion Chaisfhiaclach "the crooked toothed" in the Oidheadh Chloinne Tuireann, also translatable as "twisted teeth", from Irish cas 'twisted'. She is also glossed as being "buck-toothed".

Ceitleann Chraos-Fhiaclach is the slightly different form of the nickname that occurs in the Fenian cycle story  ("The Fairy Palace of the Quicken Trees", "Rowan Tree Palace", "The Story of the Rowan Tree Dwelling"). The headword, craos can mean a 'gap, gaping, yawning', as well as 'voraciousness', but Pearse has accepted the latter sense, and glosses the name as "ravening tooth". This Ceaithlann  also appears in Scottish copies of this tale.

Attestations

Battle of Mag Tuired 
Cethlenn is unmentioned in the narrative Cath Maige Tuired, as she is not listed in the roster of Formorians compiled by Whitley Stokes .

But in this Battle of Mag Tuired (The Second Battle of Moytura), Cethlenn hurled a javelin (gae) at the Dagda giving him a mortal wound, as recorded in theLebor Gabála Érenn.  It took 120 years before the Dagda died of the wound.

The recounting of Cethlenn injuring the Dagda is repeated in the Annals of the Four Masters, Keating's History, and O'Flaherty's Ogygia.

Cethlenn presumably fell in battle, or so it has been commented on by John O'Mahony without clarification of source.

Enniskillen 

Some local historians in the 20th century and after refer to a legend that the Cethlenn was injured and swam to Enniskillen on Loch Erne, Co. Fermanagh, where she died. The suggestion that Enniskillen is eponymous after Cethlenn is made in the early 17th century Annals of Clonmacnoise, though nothing about her swimming there is remarked on by 19th century writers. Although the present-day town is not situated on a river island, the town was named after an island fortress on the River Erne once maintained by the Maguire of Fermanagh clan.

Énrí Ó Muirgheasa suggested that this area (Breifne) which is the nexus between Ulster and Connacht should be investigated as the genuine location where the Balor legend was localized, rather than Tory Island.

Balor's wife 
Cethlenn is not explicitly called Balor's wife in the LGE, but it is thus stated in the Ogygia (1685).

Prognostication 
In the early modern Romance Oidheadh Chloinne Tuireann (OCT), Balor's wife (Céithlionn or Ceithlinn) identifies Lug as their grandson, and proclaims that once he comes into Erin, the days that they the Fomorians will remain in power are at an end.

Arthur C. L. Brown remarks on this prediction that comes true in the form of Balor's destruction by Lugh, but prefers not to make connection to the ancient version of the Cath Maige Tuired in which Lug uses a sling stone as the lethal weapon, but rather to a folktale version in which Lugh uses a spear crafted by a particular swordsmith named Gavnin Gow.

Eponyms 
The town of Enniskillen (Irish inis Cethlinn, "Cethlenn's island") in County Fermanagh, Northern Ireland is named after her.

Explanatory notes

References 
Citations

Bibliography

 
 
 
  (Some of the earlier notes on MSS in the earlier edition are wanting)
: text via Internet Archive

Fomorians
Irish goddesses

pl:Cethlenn